Satyendra Nath Brohmo Chaudhury (born 10 March 1943) is an Indian former lawyer and politician who served as a member of parliament in the 10th Lok Sabha. He represented Kokrajhar constituency from 1991 to 1996 as an independent politician. Prior to participating in the 1991 Indian general election, he served as member of Janata Party's state committee from 1978 to 1985.

Biography 
Brohmo was born on 10 March 1943 to Sitanath Brohmo Chaudhury in Bongaigaon, Assam, India. He obtained his Master's of Arts degree in Economic and Bachelor of Laws from various universities auch such as Gauhati University.

His other appointments included vice chairman of Hind Mazdoor Sabha (1981-1983) and legal advisor to Bodo Peoples' Action Committee (1988-1991). He was one of the other people who supported creation of Bodoland Territorial Region.

References 

Living people
1943 births
India MPs 1996–1997
Lok Sabha members from Assam
People from Bongaigaon district
Independent politicians in India